NFL Fever 2003 is an American football video game published and developed by Microsoft Game Studios. It was released in 2002 for the Xbox video game console. The game, which was also used for beta testing for Xbox Live, was preceded by NFL Fever 2002 and followed by NFL Fever 2004.

Reception

NFL Fever 2003 received "average" reviews according to the review aggregation website Metacritic. IGN said: "In a nutshell, Fever 2003 still does everything well that its predecessor did, while merely applying bandages and not true fixes to the things its predecessor didn't do well."

References

External links
 

2002 video games
Microsoft games
NFL Fever video games
Video games developed in the United States
Xbox games
Xbox-only games